Kyle Callan-McFadden (born 20 April 1995) is an Irish footballer who plays as a centre back for National League club, King's Lynn Town.

Career
Highly rated as a youngster in his native Ireland Callan-McFadden joined the academy at Norwich City at the age of sixteen after impressing on trial. In 2013, Callan-McFadden won the FA Youth Cup with Norwich, playing 90 minutes in both legs of the final against Chelsea. He made his first team debut for the Canaries on 28 July 2014 in a friendly against OGC Nice. He made his professional debut in Norwich's 3–1 League Cup second round victory against Crawley Town on 26 August 2014, playing the full 90 minutes. However, he was released by Norwich at the end of the 2014–15 season.

On 15 October 2015, Callan-McFadden joined Orlando City B.

On 2 December 2016, Callan-McFadden was signed by Sligo Rovers of the League of Ireland Premier Division.

After the conclusion of the 2020 League of Ireland Premier Division season, Callan-McFadden announced he would be leaving Sligo Rovers and returning to England for family reasons. He signed for King's Lynn Town of the National League.

Honours
 FAI U16 Player of the Year: 2011

References

External links

1995 births
Living people
Association footballers from County Donegal
Norwich City F.C. players
Orlando City B players
Sligo Rovers F.C. players
Republic of Ireland association footballers
Republic of Ireland under-21 international footballers
Association football central defenders
USL Championship players
Republic of Ireland expatriate association footballers